Vincenzo Carollo (8 December 1920 – 7 February 2013) was an Italian politician from Palermo and member of the Christian Democratic Party (DC).

Biography 
Carollo was born on 8 December 1920 in Castelbuono, Palermo. He would go on to get a degree in literature and later become a university assistant for University of Palermo's Ethnology department.

He served as the President of Sicily, the head of the regional government, from 1967 to 1969. He would also serve as a member of the Sicilian Regional Assembly between 1958 and 1979.

Carollo was also a member of national Senate of the Republic from 1972 until 1986. He simultaneously served as the Mayor of Castelbuono from 1969 to 1983.

Vincenzo Carollo died in Palermo on 7 February 2013, at the age of 93.

Views and associations 
In March of 1981, Carollo's name was discovered on a secret list of Propaganda Due members in Licio Gelli possession.

As a Senator Carollo was a critic of easing relations with the Soviet Union, claiming that the USSR was unfaithful to the SALT treaties.

References

External links 

 Italian Senate Page
 Sicilian Regional Assembly Page

Presidents of Sicily
Members of the Sicilian Regional Assembly
Mayors of places in Sicily
Christian Democracy (Italy) politicians
People from Castelbuono
Politicians from the Province of Palermo
1920 births
2013 deaths
Senators of Legislature VI of Italy
Senators of Legislature VII of Italy
Senators of Legislature VIII of Italy
Senators of Legislature IX of Italy